The 2022 NCAA Men's College World Series was the final stage of the 2022 NCAA Division I baseball tournament. It was scheduled from June 17 through 27 at Charles Schwab Field Omaha in Omaha, Nebraska, but ended on June 26. This marked the 75th edition of the College World Series and 72nd time the event was held in Omaha.

The tournament featured eight teams in two double elimination brackets with the two winners meeting in a best-of-three championship series.

Background
The 2022 edition of the NCAA Men's College World Series featured four teams from the SEC, all from the conference's West Division; two from the Big 12, both of which announced they would join the SEC no later than the 2025–26 school year and were later confirmed as 2024–25 entrants; and one each from the ACC and Pac-12. Most of these teams advanced to Omaha by winning on the road, as only two were national seeds. The top national seed, Tennessee, was eliminated in its Super Regional by Notre Dame in a series that went the full three games. In the MCWS itself, the #2 national seed Stanford and Texas quickly went two-and-out, with the Cardinal first getting destroyed by Arkansas 17–2 then losing handily to Auburn. The Longhorns lost their opener to Notre Dame, then exited after being hammered by the #5 national seed, archrival Texas A&M. A&M reached the Bracket 1 final, losing there to Oklahoma.

Ole Miss went 5–1 at the MCWS, beating the Auburn Tigers once and the Arkansas Razorbacks twice in three matchups to advance to the championship series, where they swept Oklahoma to win the World Series. Ole Miss defeated the Sooners 10–3 in game 1 and 4–2 in game 2 to win the MCWS title.

Participants

Bracket 
Seeds listed below indicate national seeds only

Game results

Bracket 1

Bracket 2

Finals

Game 1

Game 2

All-Tournament Team
The following players were members of the Men's College World Series All-Tournament Team.

Notes

References

External links
 NCAA Baseball Championship Information

College World Series
College World Series
College World Series
College World Series
Baseball competitions in Omaha, Nebraska
History of Omaha, Nebraska
College World Series
College baseball tournaments in Nebraska